Lars-Anders Wahlgren (born 24 August 1966) is a former professional tennis player from Sweden.

Career
Wahlgren was a top 100 player in both the singles and doubles.

He won his first Grand Slam match at the 1987 French Open, beating Guy Forget.

In 1989 he had his best singles performance in an ATP Tour event, reaching the final of the Australian Indoor Championships. He defeated defending champion Slobodan Živojinović en route to the final, where he lost to Ivan Lendl.

He reached the quarter-finals of Wellington's BP National Championship – Singles in 1990 and also made the third round of the Men's Singles at the Australian Open that year.

Wahlgren upset 15th Marc Rosset in the opening round of the 1991 Australian Open but didn't progress any further. He won the match 9–7 in the fifth set.

The following year he equaled his effort from 1990, again reaching third round in Australia. On this occasion he beat world number 20 Brad Gilbert and 12th seed Derrick Rostagno.

Wahlgren was a quarter-finalist at the 1992 Brisbane Indoor Championships. Over the next two years, he twice finished runner-up in doubles at the Kuala Lumpur Open.

The further he got in the Men's Doubles at a Grand Slam was at the 1995 Australian Open, when he and partner Ola Kristiansson made it into the third round, defeating sixth seeds David Adams and Andrei Olhovskiy along the way.

Grand Prix/ATP career finals

Singles: 1 (0–1)

Doubles: 2 (0–2)

Challenger titles

Singles: (1)

Doubles: (12)

References

External links 
 
 

1966 births
Living people
Swedish male tennis players
Sportspeople from Lund